A rage room, also known as a smash room or anger room, is a room where people can vent their rage by destroying objects. Firms offer access to such rooms on a rental basis.  Statistics show that most customers are women.  It is not effective or appropriate for people with anger management issues.

Rage rooms may include living room and kitchen replicas with furnishings and items such as televisions and desks. Clients may be allowed to bring their own possessions to destroy.

The first rage rooms were likely in Japan in 2008 or earlier. The concept has spread to other countries, such as Serbia, the United Kingdom, and Argentina. Today, hundreds of rage rooms operate in cities across the United States.

Effectiveness
A 2017 study showed that rage rooms are not effective in managing anger, and in some cases, may actually make participants more angry.  One psychologist told a news organization that while "therapy is very beneficial all the way around", destroying objects was a temporary "stopgap" at best.  For the most part, rage rooms are better at stress relief than at dealing with actual anger or rage.  Some of the stress-relieving effect may be due to the physical exercise involved.

In February 2021, Italian artist Colline di tristezza proposed to set up rage rooms and crying rooms in hospitals, nursing homes, and schools to decrease the risk of staff burnout.

Safety

While rage rooms provide a relatively safe place for destroying things, risks include slipping and falling, flying debris from items being smashed, and emotional injury. Because of this, establishments require participants to wear safety gear such as eye protection, coveralls, and gloves, and to sign a liability waiver. 

Depending upon the objects being destroyed, participants and especially the workers, who have all-day, every-day exposure to both airborne particles and contact from cleaning up the mess afterwards, may be exposed to toxic chemicals, such as the mercury in old electronics and lead in leaded glass.  High-risk items include fluorescent light bulbs, batteries, and CRT screens (such as found in older televisions).

To reduce the risk of lawsuits and to satisfy insurance requirements, participants usually have to be at least 18 years old (18 if using the room alone, or 13 if accompanied by an adult); pregnant women, intoxicated, injured or sick persons are usually excluded.

References

    
Rage (emotion)
Recreation
Leisure activities